John McCormack (9 January 1935 – 23 May 2014) was a Scottish boxer.

Life and career
Known as "Cowboy", McCormack started boxing in 1950 at the age of fifteen. He won the 1956 Amateur Boxing Association British light-middleweight title, when boxing out of the NB Loco ABC. He also held the Scottish title as an amateur. He earned the bronze medal in the light middleweight division (– 71 kg) at the 1956 Summer Olympics in Melbourne, Australia. McCormack compiled an amateur record of 103-6 (51 knockouts).

McCormack died on 23 May 2014 after suffering from Alzheimer's disease. He is survived by his wife Margaret, his daughter Kim, his son Mark, and grandchildren.

1956 Olympic results
Below is the record of John McCormack, a light middleweight boxer who represented Great Britain at the 1956 Melbourne Olympics:

 Round of 16: defeated Alexander Webster (South Africa) on points
 Quarterfinal: defeated Ulrich Krenast (West Germany) by a third-round knockout
 Semifinal: lost to Jose Torres (United States) on points (was awarded bronze medal)

See also
 List of British middleweight boxing champions

References

External links

1935 births
2014 deaths
Boxers at the 1956 Summer Olympics
Olympic boxers of Great Britain
Scottish male boxers
Light-middleweight boxers
Boxers from Glasgow
Olympic bronze medallists for Great Britain
Olympic medalists in boxing
Scottish Olympic medallists
Medalists at the 1956 Summer Olympics